John E. Peterson (born September 25, 1948) is an American football executive and former coach.  He was the sixth head football coach at Frostburg State University in Frostburg, Maryland, serving for four seasons, from 1977 to 1981, and compiling a record of 14–25. Peterson later served as head coach at Bemidji State University in Bemidji, Minnesota for seven seasons, from 1982 to 1989, compiling a record of 30–40–3.

After 18 years in college football, Peterson has spent 39 years in scouting and personnel in professional football: in the Canadian Football League (CFL), World League of American Football (WLAF), National Football League (NFL), the Alliance of American Football (AAF), the XFL (2020), The Spring League (TSL), and is now working as the Director of Player Personnel for the United States Football League (2022) (USFL).

Head coaching record

References

1948 births
Living people
BC Lions personnel
Bemidji State Beavers football coaches
Carolina Panthers scouts
Frostburg State Bobcats football coaches
Holy Cross Crusaders football coaches
NFL Europe executives
Northern Illinois Huskies football coaches
Ottawa Rough Riders personnel
Seattle Seahawks scouts
Toronto Argonauts personnel
Westminster Parsons football coaches
High school football coaches in Indiana
Eastern Michigan University alumni
Michigan State University alumni
University of Utah alumni
Sportspeople from Ann Arbor, Michigan